Elvucitabine is an experimental nucleoside reverse transcriptase inhibitor (NRTI), developed by Achillion Pharmaceuticals, Inc. for the treatment of HIV infection.

Elvucitabine belongs to a class (group) of HIV drugs called nucleoside reverse transcriptase inhibitors (NRTIs). NRTIs block an HIV enzyme called reverse transcriptase. (An enzyme is a protein that starts or increases the speed of a chemical reaction). By blocking reverse transcriptase, NRTIs prevent HIV from multiplying and can reduce the amount of HIV in the body.

Elvucitabine is similar in chemical structure to the FDA-approved NRTIs lamivudine (brand name Epivir) and emtricitabine (brand name Emtriva). However, in vitro studies have suggested that elvucitabine may work on certain HIV strains against which other NRTIs, such as lamivudine and emtricitabine, no longer work. (In vitro studies are studies done in test tubes or other laboratory equipment and not on animals or humans).

Studies have also suggested that elvucitabine may be effective against hepatitis B virus (HBV). Mechanism of action of Elvucitabine ; reveals that it acts by inhibiting reverse transcriptase which interferes with generation of DNA copies of viral RNA.

Currently, it is in Phase II clinical trials.

References

Dihydrofurans
Nucleoside analog reverse transcriptase inhibitors
Organofluorides
Pyrimidones
Experimental drugs
Hydroxymethyl compounds